Broughton Island  may refer to:

Broughton Island (New South Wales)
Broughton Island, Western Australia
Broughton Island (British Columbia), Canada
North Broughton Island, British Columbia, Canada
Broughton Island (Nunavut), island where the community of Qikiqtarjuaq is located
Qikiqtarjuaq (formerly Broughton Island), Nunavut, Canada
Broughton Island, New Zealand
Broughton Island, Georgia, USA

National adaptations of originally english name
Broutona Island, Russia — named after William Robert Broughton

See also
Broughton Archipelago, British Columbia, Canada